Shri Vijaypal Mirdha (श्री विजयपाल मिर्धा) is an Indian National Congress Leader and sitting MLA from Degana constituency in Rajasthan and a member of the Mirdha political Family. Vijaypal Singh Mirdha is the son of Richpal Singh Mirdha (Ex MLA of Degana constituency and Indian National Congress Leader).

Political career
Vijaypal Mirdha started his Political career as youth congress leader and He is elected as 1st time MLA from Degana seat of Nagaur in 2018 Rajasthan Assembly Election.

Vijaypal Mirdha has Won the Degana assembly seat with huge margin of 21538 votes by defeating Ajay singh Kilak (Cabinet Minister) of BJP on 11 December 2018.

References

Living people
21st-century Indian politicians
Indian National Congress politicians from Rajasthan
People from Nagaur district
1985 births